Frederick Delves (23 August 1876 – 28 July 1944) was an Australian cricketer. He played ten first-class cricket matches for Victoria between 1908 and 1911.

See also
 List of Victoria first-class cricketers

References

External links
 

1876 births
1944 deaths
Australian cricketers
Victoria cricketers
Cricketers from Melbourne